Ahlam Khudr ( ‘Āḥlām Khuḍr) is a Sudanese activist and nursery worker.

Khudr's son was killed in a peaceful protest in 2013 (part of the 2011–13 protests in Sudan). Since then, she has been an activist, calling herself the "mother of all martyrs." Active in underground forums, she was "brutally beaten" when arrested by security forces.

In December 2018, Ahlam Khudr was an important figure in the Sudanese Revolution. In 2019, she was listed among the BBC's 100 Women.

References

Sudanese human rights activists
Sudanese women activists
People of the Sudanese Revolution
BBC 100 Women
Year of birth missing (living people)
Living people